The 2002 WGC-American Express Championship was a golf tournament that was contested from 19–22 September at Mount Juliet Golf Course in Thomastown, Kilkenny, Ireland. It was the third WGC-American Express Championship tournament, following the cancellation of the 2001 edition in the aftermath of the September 11 attacks, and the third of four World Golf Championships events in 2002.

World number 1 Tiger Woods won the tournament, to capture his second WGC-American Express Championship and his fifth World Golf Championship. He set the tournament record for score to-par at 25 under. Woods also went the first 71 holes of the tournament without making a bogey, only bogeying the 18th hole in the final round.

Field
1. Top 50 from the Official World Golf Ranking as of 9 September
Robert Allenby (2), Stuart Appleby, Paul Azinger, Rich Beem (2), Thomas Bjørn (3), Ángel Cabrera (3), Mark Calcavecchia, Michael Campbell (3), Darren Clarke, José Cóceres, John Cook, Chris DiMarco (2), David Duval, Ernie Els (2,3), Bob Estes (2), Niclas Fasth (3), Brad Faxon (2), Fred Funk (2), Jim Furyk (2), Sergio García (2,3), Retief Goosen (2,3,5), Pádraig Harrington (3), Scott Hoch, Jerry Kelly (2), Bernhard Langer, Paul Lawrie (3), Tom Lehman, Justin Leonard (2), Peter Lonard, Davis Love III (2), Steve Lowery (2), Shigeki Maruyama (2), Len Mattiace (2), Scott McCarron (2), Rocco Mediate (2), Phil Mickelson (2), Colin Montgomerie (3), Craig Parry (4), Kenny Perry (2), Nick Price (2), Chris Riley (2), Eduardo Romero (3), Justin Rose (3,5), Adam Scott (3), Vijay Singh (2), David Toms (2), Scott Verplank, Mike Weir, Tiger Woods (2)

2. Top 30 on the 2002 PGA Tour money list as of 9 September
Craig Perks, John Rollins, Jeff Sluman, Kevin Sutherland

3. Top 20 on the 2002 European Tour Order of Merit as of 9 September
Gary Evans, Anders Hansen, Søren Hansen, Trevor Immelman, Stephen Leaney, Carl Pettersson

4. Top 3 on the 2002 PGA Tour of Australasia Order of Merit as of 9 September
Scott Laycock, Peter O'Malley

5. Top 3 on the 2001–02 Sunshine Tour Order of Merit
Tim Clark

6. Top 3 on the 2002 Japan Golf Tour Order of Merit as of 9 September
Kenichi Kuboya
Nobuhito Sato and Toru Taniguchi did not play.

7. Winner of the 2001 Asian PGA Tour Order of Merit
Thongchai Jaidee

Round summaries

First round

Second round

Third round

Final round

External links
Full results

WGC Championship
Golf tournaments in the Republic of Ireland
Golf in Leinster
Sport in County Kilkenny
WGC-American Express Championship
WGC-American Express Championship
WGC-American Express Championship